Peter Scantlebury  MBE (born 21 November 1963) is a former international professional basketball player who was capped 131 times for England.

Scantlebury began his playing career in 1981 with Guildford. He scored 9,502 points and won nine British Basketball League winners' medals in his National League career. He made his debut for England in 1986 and scored 1,069 points in an international career that lasted until 2002. He was appointed an MBE in 2002 for his services to basketball.

He was appointed head coach of Sheffield Sharks in 2003, leading them to the Haribo Cup trophy and BBL Championship play-off title in 2004, and was appointed head coach of England's men's basketball team in 2004, coaching them to a bronze medal at the Commonwealth Games in Melbourne in 2006.

Also now he is a head of y8 for Aston Academy

Coaching career 
 2003–2008 Sheffield Sharks
 2004–2006 England national team – Won Bronze at the 2006 Commonwealth Games

Playing career 
 1998–2003 Sheffield Sharks
 1997–1998 Newcastle Eagles
 1993–1997 Thames Valley Tigers
 1991–1993 London Towers
 1989–1990 Sunderland
 1985–1989 Bracknell Pirates /Tigers
 1984–1985 Winthrop University
 1981–1984 Guildford / Bracknell Pirates

References 

1963 births
Living people
Newcastle Eagles players
English basketball coaches
English men's basketball players
People from Camberwell
Sheffield Sharks players
Basketball players from Greater London
Members of the Order of the British Empire
Winthrop Eagles men's basketball players